Johannes Hendrikus "Jan" Jansen (born 26 February 1945) is a former Dutch track cyclist.

He was born in Basdorf.  He is a brother of Harrie Jansen. At the 1968 Summer Olympics he won a silver medal in the 2000 metres tandem race, and finished fifth at the sprint race.

See also
 List of Dutch Olympic cyclists

References

1945 births
Living people
People from Waldeck-Frankenberg
Sportspeople from Kassel (region)
Dutch male cyclists
Cyclists at the 1968 Summer Olympics
Olympic cyclists of the Netherlands
Medalists at the 1968 Summer Olympics
Olympic silver medalists for the Netherlands
20th-century Dutch people